German submarine U-530 was a Type IXC/40 U-boat of Nazi Germany's Kriegsmarine during World War II. She was laid down at the Deutsche Werft in Hamburg on 8 December 1941 as yard number 345, launched on 28 July 1942 and commissioned on 14 October 1942 with Kapitänleutnant Kurt Lange in command, who led her in six patrols. Lange was replaced in January 1945 by Oberleutnant zur See Otto Wermuth, who led her escape to Argentina after Germany's surrender. The submarine's voyage to Argentina led to legends, apocryphal stories, and conspiracy theories that she and  had transported escaping Nazi leaders and/or Nazi gold to South America, or even that it sank the Brazilian cruiser Bahia as the last act of the Battle of the Atlantic.

Design
German Type IXC/40 submarines were slightly larger than the original Type IXCs. U-530 was powered by two MAN M 9 V 40/46 supercharged four-stroke, nine-cylinder diesel engines for surface propulsion and two Siemens-Schuckert 2 GU 345/34 double-acting electric motors for submerged propulsion. She had two shafts and two  propellers.

The boat had 48 crew.

Sensors

Radar
U-530 was one of the few U-boats that was fitted with a FuMO 61 Hohentwiel U Radar Transmitter. It was installed on the starboard side of the conning tower.

Radar Detection
U-530 was fixed with the FuMB-26 Tunis antenne. The FuMB 26 Tunis combined the FuMB Ant. 24 Fliege and FuMB Ant. 25 Cuba II antennas. It could be mounted in either a direction finder antenna loop or separately on the bridge.

Service history
She served with the 4th U-boat Flotilla while training, then the 10th flotilla from 1 March 1943 to 30 September 1944 and the 33rd flotilla from 1 October 1944 to 8 May 1945. She surrendered in Mar del Plata, Argentina on 10 July 1945.

First patrol
The submarine left Kiel on her first patrol on 20 February 1943. Her route to the Atlantic took her through the gap between Iceland and the Faeroe Islands. On 9 March she sank the Swedish ship Milos in mid-Atlantic, at a point roughly equidistant from the southern tip of Greenland, Iceland and northwest Scotland. She then made her way to the port of Lorient in occupied France, arriving on 22 April.

Second, third and fourth patrols
These three forays were relatively uneventful, apart from her home port being moved to Bordeaux and then La Pallice.

Fifth patrol
Her fifth patrol took her to the Caribbean Sea where she attacked and damaged the American tanker Chapultepec on 26 December 1943. She was forced to return to France when she was rammed by the tanker Esso Buffalo on 29 December. She arrived at Lorient on 22 February 1944.

Sixth patrol
For her sixth sortie, U-530 departed Lorient on 22 May 1944 ultimately for operations in the Trinidad area.

The Allies had been informed of the rendezvous and directed the escort carrier  to the scene; her aircraft managed to sink I-52 with an acoustic torpedo. U-530 returned to base, this time Flensburg, after 133 days at sea.

A short journey from Kiel to Horten Naval Base in southern Norway on from 19 to 23 February was her recorded next move, but it did not count as a patrol.

Seventh patrol and surrender
U-530 departed Horten on 3 March 1945 to operate off of New York, operating as close as two or three miles of Long Island. On about 4 May the submarine sighted a convoy and attacked with three torpedoes: two missed while the third had a battery explosion and did not leave the tube. U-530 attacked a second convoy 6 May with five torpedoes and a third the next day with two more, all of which missed.

U-530 did not initially surrender at war's end, as ordered by Admiral Dönitz; instead the crew headed for Argentina and ultimately surrendered to the Argentine Navy on 10 July 1945 at Mar del Plata. Prior to their arrival the crew dumped the five remaining torpedoes, anti-aircraft gun ammunition, secret papers, and the ship's log overboard.

Her captain, Oberleutnant Otto Wermuth, did not explain why it had taken him more than two months to reach Mar del Plata, why the submarine had jettisoned its deck gun, or why the crew carried no identification.

The unexpected arrival of U-530 started many rumors. Brazilian Admiral Jorge Dodsworth Martins said he believed that U-530 could have sunk the cruiser Bahia, while Admiral Dudal Teixeira, also a Brazilian, believed that U-530 had come from Japan. An Argentine reporter claimed that he had seen a Buenos Aires provincial police report to the effect that a strange submarine had surfaced off the lower Argentine coast and had landed a high-ranking officer and a civilian who might have been Adolf Hitler and Eva Braun in disguise. , which arrived in Mar del Plata on 17 August, was also accused of sinking Bahia; however, an inquiry eventually found that the cruiser had been sunk due to a gunnery accident.

The Argentine Naval Ministry issued an official communique stating that U-530 did not sink the Bahia, that no Nazi leader or high-ranking military officers were aboard, and that U-530 had landed no one on the coast of Argentina before surrendering.

The crew of U-530 were interned. They and the boat were then transferred to the United States. The submarine was sunk as a target on 28 November 1947 by a torpedo from American submarine .

Summary of raiding history

See also
 History of Mar del Plata
 Argentina during World War II
 German submarine U-977

Notes

References

Bibliography

Los Verdaderos Últimos Días de la Segunda Guerra Mundial, Parte II: "La verdad sobre la llegada de sumergiles alemanes a la Argentina". Julio B. Mutti, HistoryBook 2013,

Further reading 
 Juan Salinas & Carlos De Nápoli (2002) Ultramar Sur: la última operación secreta del Tercer Reich ("South Overseas: the last secret operation of Third Reich")  Grupo Editorial Norma 
 Report of the interrogation of Otto Wermuth

External links

Argentina in World War II
German Type IX submarines
U-boats commissioned in 1942
U-boats sunk in 1947
World War II submarines of Germany
1942 ships
Ships sunk as targets
Ships built in Hamburg
Captured U-boats
Diplomatic incidents
Maritime incidents in Argentina
Maritime incidents in 1947